Ha! Ha! Ha! is a 1934 Fleischer Studio animated short film starring Betty Boop, and featuring Koko the Clown.

Plot
Max Fleischer draws Betty, then leaves her for the night in the studio at 5:00 pm. Koko escapes from the inkwell and helps himself to a candy bar left behind by Max. He starts to eat some of it. But, he soon gets a toothache. Betty tries to perform some amateur dentistry on Koko, by trying to yank the bad tooth out while dancing. After this fails, she attempts to calm him down but uses too much laughing gas, causing Betty and Koko to laugh hysterically. The laughing gas spreads the room, making a cuckoo clock and a typewriter laugh hysterically. The laughing gas then goes out the window and spreads into town. Both people and inanimate objects begin laughing hysterically, including a mailbox, a parking meter, a bridge, cars, and gravestones.  The short ends when Betty and Koko get back in the inkwell and it begins laughing, before panting.

Production notes
This is a partial remake of the 1924 Koko animated short, The Cure. It is also Koko's last theatrical appearance. (For more information about Koko, see Koko the Clown).

References

External links
Ha! Ha! Ha! on YouTube
Ha! Ha! Ha! at the Big Cartoon Database
Ha! Ha! Ha! at the IMDb.

1934 films
Betty Boop cartoons
Short films directed by Dave Fleischer
1930s American animated films
Articles containing video clips
American black-and-white films
1934 animated films
Paramount Pictures short films
Fleischer Studios short films